Dork / Stick Around is a split extended play by American punk rock bands AFI and Loose Change (which featured future AFI guitarist Jade Puget), released on March 2, 1993, on Key Lime Pie Records and Wilson House Records.

This was AFI's first release, put out within a year of the band's formation, and was limited to around 200 copies. The cover is a picture of AFI drummer Adam Carson. "NyQuil" was written by then-bassist Vic Chalker, and was re-recorded for the band's first full-length album, Answer That and Stay Fashionable.

Counterfeits were sold on eBay for at least a year, which prompted former AFI bassist Geoff Kresge to reveal their inauthenticity. Kresge himself reissued AFI's Dork with an added outtake on September 29, 2017, without the current band's consent.

Track listing

2017 reissue

Personnel 
Credits adapted from liner notes.

AFI 
 Adam Carson – drums
 Davey Havok – vocals
 Keith Gaudette – engineer
 Geoff Kresge – bass
 Markus Stopholese – guitar

Studios
 Recorded at City of Light, Lakeport
 Mastered and pressed at Alberti

Loose Change 
 Nate Daugherty – drums
 Levi McCann – rhythm guitar
 Jade Puget – lead guitar, vocals
 Chon Travis – bass, vocals
 Vienna Boys Choir on 3 packs a day – backing vocals

References

1993 EPs
AFI (band) EPs
Split EPs